The 2008–09 season was Udinese Calcio's 14th consecutive and 29th overall season in Serie A. The team competed in Serie A, finishing 7th, and in the Coppa Italia, reaching the quarter-finals. Having finished 7th the previous season also, Udinese competed in the 2008–09 UEFA Cup, where they were eliminated in the quarter-finals.

Players

Squad information

Transfers

In

Out

Competitions

Serie A

League table

Matches

Coppa Italia

UEFA Cup

References

Udinese Calcio seasons
Udinese